The 2017 European Throwing Cup was held on 11 and 13 March at the Gran Canaria Sport Complex "Martín Freire" in Las Palmas, Spain. It was the seventeenth edition of the athletics competition for throwing events and was jointly organised by the European Athletic Association. The competition featured men's and women's contests in shot put, discus throw, javelin throw and hammer throw. In addition to the senior competitions, there were also under-23 events for younger athletes.

Medal summary

Senior

Under-23

Team standings

References

External links
Official website

European Throwing Cup
International athletics competitions hosted by Spain
Throwing Cup
Throwing Cup
Throwing Cup
Throwing CupCup